Little Dog is a Canadian television comedy-drama series, which debuted on CBC Television on March 1, 2018. The series stars Joel Thomas Hynes as Tommy "Little Dog" Ross, a boxer who is offered the chance to redeem himself in a rematch against Rico "Havoc" St. George (Dwain Murphy), several years after forfeiting their first bout by walking away mid-match.

The series was inspired in part by Hynes' own experience as an amateur boxer, after he had to drop out of a planned match due to a rib fracture.The series is also available in the US on Pluto TV.

The cast also includes Ger Ryan, Katharine Isabelle, Andy Jones, Julia Chan, Patricia Isaac, Stephen Oates and Mary Walsh. The series was originally pitched to the CBC as a drama, but Hynes was convinced by producer Sherry White to retool it as a comedy.

Cast and characters

Main
 Joel Thomas Hynes as Tommy "Little Dog" Ross - A washed up boxer on a quest for redemption.
 Ger Ryan as Sylvia Ross - Tommy's mother, the matriarch of the family.
 Katharine Isabelle as Ginny Ross  - Tommy's younger sister, a single parent who runs a self help seminar.
 Dwain Murphy as Rico "Havoc" St. George - The professional Boxer who defeated Tommy in a big fight five years prior to the start of the series.
 Stephen Oates as Lowly Ross Jr. - Tommy's brother
 Billy Cochrane as Chesley Ross - Ginny's son who is on a quest to find out who his father is.
 Andy Jones as Lowly Ross Sr. - Sylvia's ex-husband, a disgraced convict.
 Shauna MacDonald as Tammy Mackie
 Patricia Isaac as Vaani Abdeen
 Julia Chan as Pamela - Tommy's ex-girlfriend.

Recurring
 Michael Worthman as Jean-Pierre
 Ritche Perez as Big Tammy's Cameraman
 Mary Walsh as Tucker - A local fight promoter and crime lord.
 Charlie Tomlinson as Sullivan Devereaux - The owner of a local fish plant.

Episodes

Season 1 (2018)

Season 2 (2019)

References

External links

CBC Television original programming
2018 Canadian television series debuts
2010s Canadian comedy-drama television series
Television shows set in Newfoundland and Labrador
Television shows filmed in Newfoundland and Labrador